The Ayamaru Lakes (sometimes spelled Ajamaru) are a group of lakes found in the west-central part of the Bird's Head Peninsula in Southwest Papua, Indonesia. The nearest village to the group is Greemakolo. The many villages around the Ayamaru Lakes speak Ayamaru language, a dialect of the Maybrat language.

Etymology
The word Ayamaru comes from combination of the words; Aya which means water, and Maru which means lake. People living around the lakes are called Ra ro Maru (lake people) or Ayamaru people, sub-tribe of the Maybrat people.

Physical features
The group makes up Lake Ayamaru and Lake Hain. The lakes are surrounded by many low hills. The water in both of the lakes are a clear blue because of the rich material found in the water. There are deep holes in the lakes that lead to underwater caverns. The vivid colors on the north shores of the Ayamaru Lakes are the result of pigmented bacteria in the microbial mats that grow around the edges of the mineral-rich water. The bacteria produce colors ranging from orange to red; the amount of color in the microbial mats depends on the ratio of chlorophyll to carotenoids and on the temperature of the water which favors one bacterium over another. The pH in the lake exceeds to 8.0.

Lake Ayamaru
The largest lake in the group, Lake Ayamaru has a more warm temperature than Lake Hatlin. In the center of the lake is Kaymundan Island, a small island filled with trees. Lake Ayamaru is composed of three smaller lakes called Jow, Semitu, and Yate. On the northwestern shore of the lake is the village of Greemakolo. This is also where the Ayamaru River starts. The people from the surrounding villages use the lake for fishing and bathing.

Lake Hain
This is where the Framu River flows in. Most of the lake is covered with mist because of its high temperatures. It is actually a hot spring.

Wildlife

Most of the wildlife are found in the wetlands of the southern shores of Lake Ayamura. There are four endemic fishes in the lakes, the Ajamaru Lakes rainbowfish (Melanotaenia ajamaruensis), Boeseman's rainbowfish (Melanotaenia boesemani), Vogelkop blue-eye (Pseudomugil reticulatus) and Hoese's goby (Glossogobius hoesei). Non-endemic natives include the shortfin tandan (Neosilurus brevidorsalis) and fimbriate gudgeon (Oxyeleotris fimbriata), while several other fish species have been introduced by humans.

Additionally, the Parastacid crayfish Cherax boesemani is endemic to the lakes.

References 

Lakes of Western New Guinea
Landforms of Southwest Papua